The Central Committee (CC) composition was elected by the 13th Congress, and sat from 2 June 1924 until 31 December 1925. The CC 1st Plenary Session renewed the composition of the Politburo, Secretariat and the Organizational Bureau (OB) of the All-Union Communist Party (Bolsheviks).

Plenums
The CC was not a permanent institution. It convened plenary sessions, of which nine CC plenary sessions and one joint CC–Central Control Commission (CCC)  plenary sessions were held between the 13th Congress and the 14th Congress. When the CC was not in session, decision-making powers were transferred to inner bodies of the CC itself; the Politburo, Secretariat and Orgburo (none of these bodies were permanent either, but convened several times a months).

Apparatus
Individuals employed by Central Committee's bureaus, departments and newspapers made up the apparatus between the 13th Congress and the 14th Congress. The bureaus and departments were supervised by the Secretariat, and each secretary (member of the Secretariat) supervised a specific department. The leaders of departments were officially referred to as Heads, while the titles of bureau leaders varied between chairman, first secretary and secretary.

Composition

Members

Candidates

References

General

Plenary sessions, apparatus heads, ethnicity (by clicking on the individual names on "The Central Committee elected by the XIII th Congress of the RCP (B) 31/5/1924 members" reference), the Central Committee full- and candidate membership, Politburo membership, Secretariat membership and Orgburo membership were taken from these sources:

Bibliography

Sources

Central Committee of the Communist Party of the Soviet Union
1924 establishments in the Soviet Union
1925 disestablishments in the Soviet Union